Alexander Yevgenievich Smirnov, born 17 August 1964 in Voskresensk, Soviet Union), is a former ice hockey player.

Playing career
A former Russian ice hockey player who has played for Russia's national team, winning the gold medal at IIHF's 1993 World Championships in Germany.

He played nine seasons for the Storhamar Dragons and won the Norwegian Cup as head coach with the Dragons in 2008.

Coaching career
Smirnov is currently the head coach of the Severstal Cherepovets of the Kontinental Hockey League in Russia.
He has been the head coach of the Storhamar Dragons on two occasions, and has previously coached Gjøvik Hockey, Norway.

Career statistics

Regular season and playoffs

International

References

External links

1964 births
EC Kapfenberg players
HC Khimik Voskresensk players
HC TPS players
Ice hockey players at the 1994 Winter Olympics
Living people
Olympic ice hockey players of Russia
People from Voskresensk
Russian expatriates in Norway
Russian ice hockey coaches
Russian ice hockey defencemen
Soviet ice hockey defencemen
Storhamar Dragons players
Storhamar Dragons coaches
Sportspeople from Moscow Oblast